The Truth About Men is the eighth studio album by American country music artist Tracy Byrd. Released in 2003 as the third and final album for RCA Nashville, it features the singles "The Truth About Men", "Drinkin' Bone", and "How'd I Wind Up in Jamaica". Before its release, Byrd charted in the country top 40 with the single "Lately (Been Dreamin' 'bout Babies)", which does not appear on the album.

The track "Making Memories of Us" was later recorded by The Notorious Cherry Bombs on their self-titled debut album, and again by Keith Urban on his 2004 album Be Here. Urban's rendition of the song was a Number One hit on the country music charts in 2005.

Track listing

Personnel
Tracy Byrd - lead vocals
Billy Carpenter - drums
Johnny Lee Carpenter - fiddle
Britt Godwin - electric guitar
Larry Shelton - trumpet
Stacy Clark - trumpet
Lisa Cochran - background vocals
Jim Cox - piano
Eric Darken - percussion
Randall Dennis - piano
Dan Dugmore - dobro, steel guitar
Stuart Duncan - fiddle
Paul Franklin - steel guitar
Troy Gentry - vocals on "The Truth About Men"
Andy Griggs - vocals on "The Truth About Men"
Aubrey Haynie - fiddle, mandolin
Wes Hightower - background vocals
John Hobbs - piano
John Barlow Jarvis - Hammond organ, piano, synthesizer
Troy Lancaster - electric guitar
Paul Leim - drums, percussion
B. James Lowry - acoustic guitar
Liana Manis - background vocals
Jay Dee Maness - steel guitar
Brent Mason - electric guitar
Mark Matoska - steel guitar
Eddie Montgomery - vocals on "The Truth About Men"
John J. Moore - bass guitar, background vocals
John Robinson - drums
John Wesley Ryles - background vocals
Blake Shelton - vocals on "The Truth About Men"
Leland Sklar - bass guitar 
Carey Stone - electric guitar
Michael Thompson - electric guitar
Neil Thrasher - background vocals
Billy Joe Walker Jr. - acoustic guitar, electric guitar
Gabe Witcher - fiddle
Glenn Worf - bass guitar
Reggie Young - electric guitar

Charts

Weekly charts

Year-end charts

References

2003 albums
Tracy Byrd albums
RCA Records albums
Albums produced by Billy Joe Walker Jr.